Massimo Rigoni (24 November 1961 in Asiago) is an Italian former ski jumper. He competed at the 1984 Winter Olympics.

References

External links

Italian male ski jumpers
Universiade medalists in ski jumping
1961 births
Living people
Universiade gold medalists for Italy
Competitors at the 1983 Winter Universiade
Olympic ski jumpers of Italy
Ski jumpers at the 1984 Winter Olympics